St. James Church is a historic Roman Catholic church located at 1826 Edenside Avenue in the Highlands section of Louisville, Kentucky. March 1, 1982, it was listed on the National Register of Historic Places as St. James Roman Catholic Church, Rectory, and School.

History
The parish of St. James was established in 1906 as the subdivisions in the surrounding area were rapidly being built up (three churches within a few blocks of St. James also trace their foundation to 1906). An initial wood-frame church was built in 1906 on the site of the present building, as was a wood-frame school building which was replaced with the modern brick school building in 1924. The parish house was completed in 1929.

Construction began on the modern church building in 1912 and was completed in 1913. It was designed by J.J. Gaffney, a local architect who designed buildings such as the Belvoir Apartments in Cherokee Triangle, the baroque house on Highland Avenue, Adath Jeshuran Temple and Holy Name Church.

References

National Register of Historic Places in Louisville, Kentucky
Roman Catholic churches in Louisville, Kentucky
Roman Catholic churches completed in 1913
1906 establishments in Kentucky
Churches on the National Register of Historic Places in Kentucky
20th-century Roman Catholic church buildings in the United States
Clergy houses
1913 establishments in Kentucky
Byzantine Revival architecture in the United States
Religious organizations established in 1906
Churches completed in 1913
Baroque Revival architecture in the United States